is a Japanese model and beauty pageant titleholder who won the Miss World Japan 2017 and represented Japan at Miss World 2017. She also went to Thailand to shoot a movie called “oh my boss!” As she played Japanese top idol, she only in a few episodes.

Personal life
Haruka was born in Tokyo and is a law student at Keio University.

Pageantry

Miss World Japan 2017
On September 4, 2017 Yamashita was crowned as Miss World Japan 2017 by Priyanka Yoshikawa Miss World Japan 2016 and Top 20 in Miss World 2016. She represented Japan in Miss World 2017.

Miss World 2017
She competed at the Miss World 2017 where she placed Top 15.

Filmography

Television

References

External links

1996 births
Living people
Miss World 2017 delegates
Singers from Tokyo
Japanese female idols
21st-century Japanese women singers
21st-century Japanese singers
21st-century Japanese actresses
Japanese expatriates in Thailand